Mushkegowuk—James Bay is a provincial electoral district in Ontario, Canada. It elects one member to the Legislative Assembly of Ontario. This riding was created from the northern portion of Timmins—James Bay by the Far North Electoral Boundaries Commission in 2017. The Legislative Assembly of Ontario approved the new riding on October 24, 2017.

Unlike most Ontario provincial districts, Mushkegowuk—James Bay does not have the same boundaries as a federal district.  As well, the riding, with a population of 30,037, is significantly smaller than the average Ontario district (with a population of 110,000) or the average Northern Ontario district (with a population of 76,000).  National Post columnist Josh Dehaas criticized of the new ridings of Mushkegowuk—James Bay and Kiiwetinoong as violating the principle of representation by population.

Mushkegowuk—James Bay was originally to be named Mushkegowuk, but the name was changed to Mushkegowuk—James Bay by the legislature, which authorized further consultations over the riding's name by the Attorney General. It is 27 per cent indigenous and 60 per cent francophone.  Indigenous leaders have criticized the new riding for not having a high enough percentage of indigenous people.

Members of Provincial Parliament

Election results

References

External links 
Map of riding for 2018 election

Ontario provincial electoral districts
Kapuskasing